The Pembroke Public Library is a single-branch public library in Pembroke, Ontario, Canada.

Services 
The Pembroke Public Library offers many useful services to the city of Pembroke and its surrounding area. Some of these services include: 
 A comprehensive online catalogue search 
 Inter-library loans, which can be requested in person or online, if the library does not have the item you require
 Personalized delivery to those who are homebound
 The ability to renew materials in person, online, or by phone
 The ability to make genealogical requests, in person or online
 Links to homework help online for teens
 Various services for teachers, parents/home schooling, and newcomers 
 Non-resident memberships

Programming and Events 
Besides these services, the Pembroke Public Library has a considerable amount of programming and events available to the community. Some programming is for everyone, such as the gardening and healthy cooking club, and some programs are targeted for adults and for children separately. Programs for adults include four different book clubs and a writer's club. Programs for children include a Lego Club, Nintendo Wii available to play every second Saturday, many various seasonal programs, and two children's book clubs. Library tours are available for school classes as well. See the library's website for complete details on the many events happening each month.

Building
The current building was designed by Francis Sullivan, a contemporary of Frank Lloyd Wright. The building was designated under Part 4 of the Ontario Heritage Act in 1991.

History
The library is a Carnegie library, having received a grant of $14,000 from the Carnegie Foundation on December 24, 1907.

Subhash Mehta was the chief librarian of the Pembroke Public Library from 1970 to 2002. The Subhash Mehta Memorial Reading Room is now dedicated to his memory.

References

See also
 List of Carnegie libraries in Canada

Carnegie libraries in Canada
Buildings and structures in Renfrew County
Pembroke, Ontario
Public libraries in Ontario
Education in Renfrew County
Library buildings completed in 1931
Designated heritage properties in Ontario